Ronald Crosby (born March 2, 1955) is a former American football linebacker who played six seasons in the National Football League (NFL) with the New Orleans Saints and New York Jets. He was drafted by the Detroit Lions in the fifth round of the 1977 NFL Draft. He played college football at Pennsylvania State University and attended South Allegheny Middle/Senior High School in McKeesport, Pennsylvania. Crosby was also a member of the Pittsburgh Maulers and Baltimore Stars of the United States Football League.

References

External links
Just Sports Stats
USFL trading card

Living people
1955 births
Players of American football from Pennsylvania
American football linebackers
Penn State Nittany Lions football players
New Orleans Saints players
New York Jets players
Pittsburgh Maulers players
Philadelphia/Baltimore Stars players
Sportspeople from McKeesport, Pennsylvania